Dominion is a live album by American singer-songwriter Don McLean, released in 1982. It was recorded at a performance at the Dominion Theatre, London, in 1980. It was reissued in 1990 on CD.  It has also been released as Greatest Hits Live.

Track listing
"It's Just the Sun" 	 
"Building My Body"	 
"Wonderful Baby"	 
"The Very Thought of You"	 
"Fool's Paradise"
"Baby I Don't Care" 		 
"You Have Lived"	 
"The Statue"	 
"Prime Time" 	 
"American Pie"
"Left for Dead" 		 
"Believers"	 
"Sea Man" 	 
"It's a Beautiful Life"	 
"Chain Lightning"	 
"Crazy Eyes"	 
"La I Love You" 		 
"Dream Lover"	 
"Crying"	 
"Vincent"

Notes
"The Very Thought of You" composed by Ray Noble
"Fool's Paradise" composed by Horace Linsley and Norman Petty
"Baby I Don't Care" composed by Mike Stoller with lyrics by Jerry Leiber
"Crying" composed by Joe Melson and Roy Orbison
"Dream Lover" composed by Bobby Darin
All other songs by Don McLean.

References

1982 live albums
Don McLean live albums